"Runnin' Outta Moonlight" is a song recorded by American country music artist Randy Houser. It was released in March 2013 as the second single from his third studio album, How Country Feels. It was written by Dallas Davidson, Ashley Gorley, and Kelley Lovelace.

Critical reception
Billy Dukes of Taste of Country gave the song three and a half stars out of five, writing that "[Houser's] vocal performance demands attention and offers a pleasing reward in a story of two lovers enjoying a date in the country," adding "we’ve heard this same story 1,000 times, but it feels freshly pulled from a clean spring when Houser opens up." Alanna Conaway of Roughstock gave the song four stars out of five, saying that "it's an of the moment, spend time with one you love kind of love song, one that has a delicious up-tempo sing-a-long melody and a nicely written lyrical cadence permed expertly by Randy Houser."

Music video
The music video was directed by Wes Edwards and premiered in May 2013.

Chart performance
"Runnin' Outta Moonlight" debuted at number 56 on the U.S. Billboard Country Airplay chart for the week of March 2, 2013. It also debuted at number 41 on the U.S. Billboard Hot Country Songs chart for the week of February 9, 2013. It also debuted at number 91 on the U.S. Billboard Hot 100 chart for the week of May 25, 2013. It also debuted at number 93 on the Canadian Hot 100 chart for the week of May 25, 2013. As of October 2013, the song has sold 1,028,000 copies in the US.

Year-end charts

Certifications

References

2013 singles
Randy Houser songs
BBR Music Group singles
Songs written by Dallas Davidson
Songs written by Ashley Gorley
Songs written by Kelley Lovelace
Music videos directed by Wes Edwards
2013 songs